Ada Clendenin Williamson (1880–1958) was an American book illustrator.

Life
She was the daughter of Joseph Williamson, and Ada H. Peirce Williamson.
Her papers are held at the Archives of American Art.

Works
Carroll Watson Rankin, The Cinder Pond, New York: H. Holt and Co., c1915; Nabu Press, 2011, 
Dorothy Canfield Fisher, Understood Betsy, New York: Henry Holt and Company, 1917;

References

External links
 
 
http://discover.hsp.org/Record/hsp.opac.v01-119379
http://onlinebooks.library.upenn.edu/webbin/book/lookupname?key=Williamson%2C%20Ada%20Clendenin%2C%201880-1958

1880 births
1958 deaths
American illustrators